Lowlander or Lowlanders may refer to:

Lowlander (album), a 2000 album by Ed Miller
Albion Lowlander, a Scottish-built low-height double-decker bus
Lowlanders Białystok, an American football team based in Białystok, Poland

See also
Lowland (disambiguation)